At least two ships of the French Navy have been named Casque:

 , a  launched in 1910 and scrapped in 1927
 , a  launched in 1938 and scuttled in 1942

French Navy ship names